Mayewski Peak is a peak in the Saint Johns Range of Victoria Land, Antarctica, located midway on the ridge that bounds the north side of Baldwin Valley. It was named by the Advisory Committee on Antarctic Names for Paul A. Mayewski who participated in United States Antarctic Research Program glaciological and geological work at the McMurdo Station area (1968–69), McGregor Glacier (1970–71), the Willett Range and Convoy Range (1971–72) and Rennick Glacier (1974–75).

References

Mountains of Victoria Land
Scott Coast